The European Migration Network (EMN) is an EU funded network, set up with the aim of providing up-to-date, objective, reliable and comparable information on migration and asylum for Institutions of the European Union, plus authorities and institutions of the Member States of the European Union, in order to inform policymaking. The EMN also serves to provide the wider public with such information. The EMN was established by the Council of the European Union Decision 2008/381/EC adopted on 14 May 2008.

Objectives 
The need for Member States to exchange information on all aspects of migration, and to contribute to a common asylum and immigration policy was initially proposed by the Laeken European Council in 2001 and reinforced through the Thessaloniki European Council in 2003, the year the EMN was launched as a pilot project. The Hague Programme reinforced the need for common analysis of migratory phenomena, and the successor Stockholm Programme contains many elements for the better comparability and exchange of information between Member States across the wide range of asylum and migration policy developments. Within this context, the EMN was established in 2008.

Network structure and organisation 
The EMN is co-ordinated by the European Commission under the responsibility of the Directorate for Migration and Home Affairs, and in co-operation with National Contact Points (EMN NCPs) appointed in each Member State, and Norway, by their national government. The EMN NCPs consist of Ministries of Interior and of Justice, plus Research Institutes, Non-Governmental Organisations, and the national offices of an International Organisation. Each EMN NCP in turn co-ordinates a national network of relevant stakeholder organisations. The EMN is overseen by a Steering Board, chaired by the commission and including one representative from the Member States participating in the adoption of Council Decision 2008/381/EC plus, with observer status, representatives from the European Parliament, Frontex, Fundamental Rights Agency, European Asylum Support Office and the EU Anti-Trafficking Coordinator.

Reports, studies and other outputs 
The EMN produces Annual Policy Reports and Studies and Policy Briefs (EMN Informs) on policy-relevant asylum and migration themes. The Reports and Studies are based on information held or collected by network members in the Member States, rather than primary research, which is then synthesised to provide a comparative perspective at the EU level. The EMN also has an Ad Hoc Query system for use by EMN members and has developed an EMN Asylum and Migration Glossary with the aim to incorporate this into the Inter-Active Terminology for Europe (IATE). The EMN also provides regular updates on political developments at EU level and in Member States, latest available migration and international protection statistics; and news of its own and other relevant outputs through its regular EMN Bulletin.

Since 2009, the EMN has contributed to the European Commission's Annual Report on Immigration and Asylum- and as of 2014 the EMN has been commissioned to develop the Annual Report on Immigration and Asylum at EU level, providing an EU overview on Immigration and Asylum. Also its work regularly contributes to EU debates on specific aspects of migration and asylum policy, for example, labour demand, irregular migration, family reunification and international students.

The EMN works closely with other relevant entities, both within EU institutions and elsewhere, particularly in relation to specific studies and policy themes. These include the commission's Eurostat and Directorate-General for Research (European Commission), the Fundamental Rights Agency (FRA), Frontex, the European Asylum Support Office (EASO), the EU Anti-Trafficking Coordinator and Eurocities.

Recent developments 
According to the Council Decision (2008/381/EC) establishing the EMN, an external and independent evaluation, on the development of the EMN, should be presented by the commission to the European Parliament every three years.

Therefore, a second independent evaluation of the EMN was undertaken in 2015. In general, the EMN received again a positive assessment and its relevance and coherence were considered as increasingly relevant under the policy-making framework. EMN outputs and activities proved to be of high quality and aligned to the main EMN objectives. Regarding the EMN impact, while the evaluation found that this might vary across Member States, it was however highlighted that the EMN has achieved a commendable level of impact at the EU level. Finally, the evaluation also noted that the EMN demonstrated to be highly reactive to the findings and conclusions of the first external evaluation.

First EMN external evaluation: after the EMN establishment, an independent External Evaluation on the development of the EMN commenced in 2010 was completed at the end of 2011. An overall positive assessment was given with a number of areas identified where the EMN could improve further its support for policymaking, notably in terms of adapting its functioning and outputs to be better suited to the needs of policymakers; to increase further its flexibility, so that the EMN can develop further its capacity to respond to short-term information needs, as well as provide a longer-term perspective; and to have better coherence/co-operation with other entities. These elements were taken on board in the EMN's Work Programmes for 2012 and 2013 with a number of innovations from previous years, to better respond to the information needs of policymakers. Following on from this evaluation, the commission has published a Development Report on the EMN and its future, (COM (2012) 427 final) on 1 August 2012.

References

External links
 EMN Official Website
 Council Decision 2008/381/EC adopted on 14 May 2008
 Frontex Official Website
 EASO Official Website
 EU Anti-Trafficking Coordinator
 Report on the Development of the EMN
 EMN Status Reports

Institutions of the European Union
Human migration